is a Japanese manga artist. He is known for creating the  series K-On! which was also adapted as an anime by Kyoto Animation.

Works
  (2007, Houbunsha) (2010, English licensing Yen Press)
  (2011, Houbunsha)
  (2011, Houbunsha)
  (2018, Houbunsha)
 Kanamemo (end card illustration, ep 8) (2009)
 Yuyushiki (end card illustration, ep 8) (2013)

References

External links
 Kakifly Official website 
 

Living people
Manga artists from Kyoto Prefecture
Year of birth missing (living people)